Afroneta blesti is a species of sheet weaver spider found in Ethiopia. It was described by Merrett & Russell-Smith in 1996.

References

Linyphiidae
Spiders described in 1996
Spiders of Africa
Endemic fauna of Ethiopia